Jehovist may refer to:

Jehovist or Yahwist, an adherent of Yahwism
Jahwist, one of the four sources making up the Pentateuch (Torah) according to the documentary hypothesis
Jehovist, a person who maintain that the vowel-points annexed to the Hebrew word יהוה are its proper vowels
Yehowists, a Russian sect founded in the 19th century
Jehovah's Witnesses (used pejoratively)

See also
Jehovah (disambiguation)
Yahweh (disambiguation)